Alexander William Tamba Dankworth (born 14 May 1960) is an English jazz bassist and composer.

Biography
Born in London, the son of John Dankworth and Cleo Laine, Alec Dankworth grew up in the villages of Aspley Guise and Wavendon, living at the Old Rectory, Wavendon, where his parents established the Wavendon All-Music Plan (WAP) that includes the Stables Theatre. After attending Bedford School, he studied at the Berklee College of Music in Boston, Massachusetts, in 1978, and then joined his parents' quintet. Between 1980 and 1983 he toured the United States, Australia, and Europe with them, going on to work with Tommy Chase, the BBC Big Band, and Clark Tracey, with whom he recorded two albums.

Dankworth recorded an arrangement of Duke Ellington's Black, Brown, and Beige with violinist Nigel Kennedy in 1986, with whom he also performed Antonio Vivaldi's The Four Seasons. He also played in the 1980s with Dick Morrissey, Spike Robinson, Jean Toussaint, Michael Garrick, Tommy Smith, Julian Joseph, and Andy Hamilton, as well as leading his own quartet.

In 1990 he was invited to join and tour with Dave Brubeck's band, and in 1993 he worked with Abdullah Ibrahim, touring Europe and South Africa. He has played with Mose Allison, Clark Terry, Mel Tormé, Anita O'Day, Peter King, Alan Barnes, David-Jean Baptiste, Van Morrison and Martin Taylor, among others. He also co-led a 14-piece band with his father, John Dankworth: the Alec and John Dankworth Generation Band (or "Generation Band"), with which he has recorded two albums.

In 2013 Dankworth toured with the Ginger Baker Jazz Confusion, a quartet comprising Dankworth on bass, drummer Ginger Baker, saxophonist Pee Wee Ellis and percussionist Abass Dodoo. Dankworth is also a tutor for the National Youth Jazz Collective.

Discography

As co-leader
1994: Nebuchadnezzar (Jazz House)
1996: Rhythm Changes (Jazz House)

As sideman
With Dave Brubeck
 The 40th Anniversary Tour of the U.K. (Telarc, 1999)
 Dave Brubeck: Live with the LSO (Telarc, 2000)
 The Crossing (Telarc, 2001)
 Double Live from the U.S.A. and U.K. (Telarc, 2001)

References

Ian Carr, Digby Fairweather, & Brian Priestley. Jazz: The Rough Guide. 
Richard Cook & Brian Morton. The Penguin Guide to Jazz on CD 6th edition.

External links
[ Alec Dankworth] — discography from Allmusic

1960 births
Alumni of the Guildhall School of Music and Drama
British jazz double-bassists
Male double-bassists
English bass guitarists
English male guitarists
Male bass guitarists
English jazz composers
English male composers
Living people
Male jazz composers
People educated at Bedford School
People from Aspley Guise
People from Marylebone
21st-century double-bassists
21st-century British male musicians
Dave Brubeck Quartet members
Basho Records artists